Dibër may refer to:

Dibër Valley, known today as the "Two Dibers", a tribal-highland region of northern Albania with the administrative and commercial center in Debar that was split between Albania and Yugoslavia, present North Macedonia

Albania 
Dibër County, a county in northeastern Albania
Dibër District, an abolished district in northeastern Albania
Dibër Municipality, a municipality in northeastern Albania

North Macedonia 
Debar, a town in northwestern North Macedonia within 
Debar Municipality, a municipality in northwestern North Macedonia
Debar dialect
Debar Lake

History 
Sanjak of Dibra
Ohrid–Debar uprising